Manuel Cabral Aguado-Bejarano (1827, Seville - 1891, Seville) was a Spanish painter in the Romantic style; best known for his Costumbrismo scenes.

Biography 
He was the son of the painter, Antonio Cabral Bejarano. He actually began his studies with José Domínguez Bécquer and only later took lessons from his father. In 1845, he enrolled at what is now the Real Academia de Bellas Artes de Santa Isabel de Hungría in Seville. After graduating, he was named an honorary "Painter to the Queen" (Isabel II). Many years later, he became a Professor there. 

He received honorary mention at the Exposiciones Nacionales de Bellas Artes in 1858, 1864, 1879 and 1880, (in Cádiz), and in 1856, 1858, 1867 and 1878 in Seville. His great attention to the fine details of dress, architecture and everyday objects makes his paintings of significant documentary value. 

Although he is most familiar as a painter of genre scenes, he also produced many portraits; notably those for the French Ducal family of Montpensier, for whom he worked in 1877, and the actors,  (dressed in her role of Adriana Lecouvreur) and Julián Romea (dressed as Sullivan). The latter works may be seen at the Museo del Romanticismo in Madrid. Other important examples of his work may be found at the Carmen Thyssen Museum in Málaga.

By the time of his death, his works had come to be considered old-fashioned.

Selected paintings

References

Further reading
 Antonio Reina Palazón, La pintura costumbrista en Sevilla (1830-1870), pgs.209-222. Sevilla, Universidad, 1979

External links

 More works by Aguado-Bejarano @ ArtNet
 Paintings and Brief Biography @ the Carmen Thyssen Museum
 Biographical notes @ MCN Biografías

1827 births
1891 deaths
Spanish painters
Spanish genre painters
Painters from Seville
Spanish portrait painters